Pretty Wild is an American reality television series that premiered on E! on March 14, 2010 and ran for one season. The series chronicles the lives of sisters Alexis Neiers, Gabby Neiers and Tess Taylor as they make their way into the Hollywood social scene. The girls and their family initially resided in Westlake Village, California but eventually moved to Hollywood Hills West, Los Angeles.

In mid-2009, after the pilot was filmed, Alexis was arrested for being involved with a group known as the "Bling Ring" that broke into the homes of many celebrities, including Orlando Bloom, Paris Hilton, Lindsay Lohan, and Rachel Bilson. Pretty Wild partly chronicles Alexis's trial. On May 10, 2010, Alexis pleaded no contest to felony burglary and was sentenced to six months in Los Angeles County Jail. Her sentence was scheduled to begin June 24, 2010.

In the London Review of Books, Andrew O'Hagan wrote about the series' principals: "If real fame is a mask that eats into the face, then pseudo-fame, the current kind, might be a decoy that eats into the brain. You often meet those people in California, people who have forgotten that you are real, that you watch the news, that you know who they really are. They begin to lie to journalists and themselves with the same grim hope: if I say this and no one contradicts me it might be true. A sense of entitlement stands in for personal values. They don't mind if they're fooling you and fooling themselves, so long as they can keep the show on the road."

A feature film, The Bling Ring, was released in the mid-2013. The movie is based on the burglaries committed by the eponymous group.

Cast
 Tess Taylor is the adopted daughter of Andrea Arlington. She is pursuing a modeling career and is a Playboy Cyber Girl.
 Alexis Neiers is also pursuing a modeling career, she tries to clear her name after an arrest related to "Bling Ring" thefts.
 Gabby Neiers is the younger sister of Alexis.
 Andrea Arlington is the mother of Tess, Alexis and Gabby. She is a former 1980s lingerie model who manages Tess' and Alexis' modeling careers.
 Jerry Dunn is Andrea's husband and stepfather of Alexis, Gabby and Tess.

Episodes

References

General references 
 
 
 

2010s American reality television series
2010 American television series debuts
2010 American television series endings
English-language television shows
E! original programming
Television shows set in Los Angeles